Life Sucks...Let's Dance! is the ninth studio album by American ska punk band Reel Big Fish, released on December 21, 2018 through Rock Ridge Music. It is their first album since 2012's Candy Coated Fury. It is supported by the lead single "You Can't Have All of Me".

Recording
The band began working on the album in January 2018 at engineer David Irish's recently built Pot of Gold Studio in Orange, California. Frontman Aaron Barrett stated that "Recording the album with this lineup was really fun" and the album will have a "little pissed off-ness in there and some sarcastic, funny lyrics as usual [...] Also, I just got married, so there might be a few sappy love songs on the album, too. Yuck!"

Trumpet player John Christianson also said to fans about the album that "We're going to make you laugh, we're going to make you dance, we're going to make you raise your middle finger. We're going to make you forget about your problems and live."

Track listing

Personnel
Aaron Barrett - guitar, vocals
John Christianson - trumpet
Derek Gibbs - bass
Matt Appleton - saxophone, baritone saxophone, vocals
Billy Kottage - trombone, Hammond B3, Fender Rhodes, upright piano
Ed Smokey Beach - drums, percussion
David Irish -  vocals

References

2018 albums
Reel Big Fish albums
Rock Ridge Music albums